Iván Huayhuata (born 9 March 1989) is a Bolivian football defender who plays for Club Aurora.

References

1989 births
Living people
Sportspeople from Cochabamba
Bolivian footballers
Club Aurora players
Nacional Potosí players
C.D. Jorge Wilstermann players
C.D. Palmaflor del Trópico players
Bolivian Primera División players
Association football defenders